Henriëtte Weersing (born 11 October 1965) is a retired volleyball player from the Netherlands, who represented her native country at two consecutive Summer Olympics, starting in 1992. 

Weersing was a leading member of the Netherlands national team that won the gold medal at the 1995 European Championship by defeating Croatia 3–0 in the final.

References
  Dutch Olympic Committee

1965 births
Dutch women's volleyball players
Volleyball players at the 1992 Summer Olympics
Volleyball players at the 1996 Summer Olympics
Olympic volleyball players of the Netherlands
Sportspeople from Groningen (province)
People from Winschoten
Living people